Macholtz Stadium is a 4,300-seat multi-purpose stadium in Anderson, Indiana. The facility is located on the campus of Anderson University and is named in honor of Dr. James Macholtz who served as coach of the Anderson University football, Track and Field programs, and men's and women's lacrosse.

The stadium is primarily used for American football and track and field. It is home to the Anderson University football and track and field teams.

The facility opened in 1977.

In 2015, the Indianapolis Colts returned to Macholtz Stadium for training camp.

Major renovations
In 2008, the university completed a renovation project with the overall cost at approximately $800,000. Improvements included an artificial turf field and outdoor all-weather lights. The field enhancements were funded through new gift resources as a part of the university's $110 million "Dreams. Discovery. Direction" campaign.

References

Anderson Ravens football
College football venues
Sports venues in Indiana
Multi-purpose stadiums in the United States
Buildings and structures in Anderson, Indiana
1977 establishments in Indiana
Sports venues completed in 1977